Bolshoye Annenkovo is a rural locality and the administrative center of Bolsheannenkovsky Selsoviet Rural Settlement, Fatezhsky District, Kursk Oblast, Russia. Population:

Geography 
The village is located on the Usozha River (a left tributary of the Svapa in the basin of the Seym), 118 km from the Russia–Ukraine border, 43 km north-west of Kursk, 13.5 km north-east of the district center – the town Fatezh.

 Climate
Bolshoye Annenkovo has a warm-summer humid continental climate (Dfb in the Köppen climate classification).

Transport 
Bolshoye Annenkovo is located 14.5 km from the federal route  Crimea Highway as part of the European route E105, 17 km from the road of regional importance  (Kursk – Ponyri), 7 km from the road  (Fatezh – 38K-018), on the road of intermunicipal significance  (M2 "Crimea Highway" – Zykovka – Maloye Annenkovo – 38K-039), 15.5 km from the nearest railway station Vozy (railway line Oryol – Kursk).

The rural locality is situated 43 km from Kursk Vostochny Airport, 167 km from Belgorod International Airport and 220 km from Voronezh Peter the Great Airport.

References

Notes

Sources

Rural localities in Fatezhsky District
Fatezhsky Uyezd